Art Muscle Magazine (1986–1997) was a bi-monthly art publication located in Milwaukee, Wisconsin. It was initiated by Debra Brehmer (a writer, art historian and curator) while she was in graduate school at the University of Wisconsin–Milwaukee. The first issue was published in September 1986. The initial group dispersed after the first issue and the magazine was run for the next nine years by publisher/editor Debra Brehmer and her business partner and collaborator Therese Gantz. The magazine was sold in 1995 to Judith Moriarty, who published it until June 1997.

Circulation and contributors 
Art Muscle's circulation was 20,000. It was distributed free in Wisconsin and sold on newsstands nationally.  The broad-side format was modeled after Interview Magazine in New York City. It covered a range of activities from visual art to theater, dance, music, architecture and vernacular concerns.

Art Muscle held a for-profit status and raised money through the sale of advertising.

Archive  
The entire 10 year inventory of Art Muscle Magazine is now a digital database at the University of Wisconsin-Milwaukee Special Collections.

References

 http://expressmilwaukee.com/article-20309-camelot-or-spamalot.html
 http://urbanmilwaukeedial.com/2011/03/07/milwaukee-artist-pocket-collection-redefining-hip/
 http://portraitsocietygallery.com/about/
 john blum http://www4.uwm.edu/c21/pages/about/staff/john.html
 http://www.jsonline.com/entertainment/arts/michelle-grabner-marries-midwest-pragmatism-to-high-art-b99487928z1-303101401.html

Visual arts magazines published in the United States
Bimonthly magazines published in the United States
Defunct magazines published in the United States
Magazines established in 1986
Magazines disestablished in 1996
Magazines published in Wisconsin
Mass media in Milwaukee